Kenneth Young, also known as Kenneth C. M. Young or Kenny Young, is a Scottish freelance audio director, composer, sound designer and writer. He is best known for his award-winning work on the audio experiences in Media Molecule's LittleBigPlanet and Tearaway video game franchises, and the music of Sony Japan Studio's Astro Bot games.

Early life and education

Young was born in Edinburgh, Scotland, and had a strong musical upbringing, learning the violin from the age of six, but chose not to pursue performance as a career and instead went on to study an undergraduate degree in Music Technology at the University of Edinburgh. That course introduced him to working creatively with sound and he went on to gain an MA in Sound Design at Bournemouth University for which he received a distinction.

Career

Young began his professional career in 2004 working as a junior sound designer in the centralised audio department of Sony London Studio. He worked on a broad range of different gaming experiences and hardware platforms, from action-adventure games such as The Getaway: Black Monday and Heavenly Sword to more family-friendly and innovative titles such as EyeToy: Kinetic. He has described this period as "an apprenticeship" and a "baptism by fire" which stood him in good stead for his future game audio work.

Young left Sony in 2007 and joined startup video game developer Media Molecule to establish their audio department and "make LittleBigPlanet sound awesome".

The audio experience in LittleBigPlanet was very well received, garnering an exceptional eight GANG award nominations in 2009, more than any other game that year, and four academy nominations. Young and fellow composer Mat Clark won the GANG awards for Best Original Instrumental (for "The Gardens") and Best Interactive Score.

For LittleBigPlanet 2, Young built upon the eclecticism of the original's soundtrack by working with six other composers, the results of which achieved a nomination in 2012 for Outstanding Achievement in Original Music Composition from the Academy of Interactive Arts & Sciences.

Tearaway's folk-infused soundtrack received a 2014 British Academy Video Games Award nomination for Original Music and is notable for its hand-made aesthetic, being written and performed entirely by Young and co-composer Brian D'Oliveira. Kotaku's Kirk Hamilton considered it one of the best video game soundtracks of 2013, writing "It's jarring to hear out-of-tune instruments in a video game; we've become so accustomed to pitch-perfect digital performances that any hint of humanity is startling. I'd like to be startled like this more often".

On 27 February 2015, Young announced that he was leaving Media Molecule to pursue a freelance career.

Works

Games

Albums

The official video game soundtrack album for Tearaway was released alongside the game as a pre-order bonus on 22 November 2013. The album was later made available via the PlayStation Network.

The official video game soundtrack album for Tearaway Unfolded was released alongside the game on 8 September 2015 via the PlayStation Network and on 16 October 2015 via iTunes.

The official video game soundtrack album for Tethered was released alongside the game on 27 October 2016 via the PlayStation Network and on 27 February 2017 via Steam.

The official video game soundtrack album for WonderWorlds was released on 11 December 2017.

The official video game soundtrack album for Astro Bot Rescue Mission was released on 30 January 2019, with a vinyl album following in August 2020.

The official video game soundtrack album for Astro's Playroom was released on 12 March 2021.

Writing

Young started the website gamesound.org in 2005 "as a useful resource for those who work in, aspire to work in, or wish to learn more about game sound". Most of his own writing featured on the site is focused on the subject of the use of voice in games. He has twice won the GANG Best Game Audio Article Publication or Broadcast award for his articles The Use of Voice in Portal 2 (2012) and The Mix in The Last of Us (2015).

He has also written for designingsound.org, and contributed a chapter to the book Production Pipeline Fundamentals for Film and Games, edited by Renee Dunlop, entitled The Game Audio Pipeline.

Young was co-writer of Tearaways and Tearaway Unfoldeds voice script with the game's lead creator, Rex Crowle.

Awards and nominations

References

External links
Official Website

MobyGames rap sheet

Alumni of Bournemouth University
Alumni of the University of Edinburgh
Living people
Musicians from Edinburgh
Media Molecule
Scottish composers
Video game composers
Year of birth missing (living people)